Ranaweera is a Sinhalese surname. It may refer to:

 Inoka Ranaweera, a Sri Lankan cricketer
 Jayatissa Ranaweera, a Sri Lankan politician
 M. P. Ranaweera, a Sri Lankan academic
 Prasanna Ranaweera, a Sri Lankan politician 
 R. P. A. Ranaweera Pathirana, a Sri Lankan politician
 Vijitha Ranaweera, a Sri Lankan politician

Sinhalese surnames